Palarivattom (MRC) is a region in the city of Kochi in the state of Kerala, India. It is part of the District of Ernakulam. The region makes a four-directional intersection at its highway signal point on the Kochi Bypass, which leads to 1) the Vyttila Junction in the South (which further extends to the Southern regions of Kerala like Mararikulam, Alleppey, Kollam, Trivandrum, etc.), 2) Kakkanad in its western direction, which is the IT hub of Kochi city, 3) the main junction of Edapally in its north end, which then diverges into the Northern and North-western regions of Kerala such as Kodangallur, Guruvayur, Thrissur, Calicut, etc., and 4) eastward towards the central town area of Kochi. The junction is sometimes also referred to as pipeline junction. Santhigiri Ashram Ernakulam Branch is in palarivattom.

It is a commercial area, which gained importance as a connecting point between the city's different taluks when the district's administration was moved to the nearby suburb of Kakkanad.

The name Palarivattom has evolved from the name Pagalnarivattom. Pagal Nari Vattom means a place where jackals roam even in the daytime. Nowadays the region is a bustling suburb and a concrete jungle, with no jackal habitation.

The State Highway SH41 starts from Palarivattom and ends at Thekkadi.

Commerce

Palarivattom's claim to fame in the early day was its vegetable and fruit markets and its close proximity to the crowded Kaloor market. It also gained fame for housing the famous Rappai Thattukada, a roadside eatery serving deep-fried chicken which soon gained cult status among Malayalees in the 90s.

Today, there are several IT training centers, salons, gyms, supermarkets, retail stores, and boutique restaurants that have opened up on the stretch from the round junction to its signal junction.

Palarivattom also houses branches of all major Indian banks including the State Bank of India, the Federal Bank, HDFC Bank, Axis Bank, ICICI Bank, and the Catholic Syrian Bank, Corporation Bank Zonal Office, and has a major telephone exchange of BSNL.

The first Malayalam news channel, Indiavision, broadcasts its news bulletins from Palarivattom.

Palarivattom station of the Kochi Metro phase I line is located in the outskirts of the area, along the Kaloor - Edappally Road next to the Renai Hotel. The phase II line of the metro from Kaloor Stadium to Kakkanad has stations at Palarivattom round-about as well as the Bypass Junction. To alleviate the traffic congestion at the Palarivattom junction a flyover was built and it was opened to the public on 12 October 2016 by chief minister Pinarayi Vijayan. However, the bridge was closed in May 2019 due to extensive cracks on its pier caps and girders. The expert committee reports found serious lapses in the construction and recommended for rehabilitation of the flyover to ensure structural stability.

People and Landmarks

Palarivattom is one of the few centers in Kochi city where small shops selling cigarettes, fruit juices and snacks remain open till the early hours of dawn.

There is a Janamaithri Police Station right at the round, as well as two petrol pumps.

The region has seen the growth of real estate, with the trading community having set base here for the last few decades. The Private Bus Operator's Association is also based at Palarivattom.

Most of the business activity in this region shuts down by 9 or 10 pm. In the morning, the junction transforms into a major point of sourcing labor for construction work. Hordes of laborers can be seen flocking the junction in the early morning hours. Palarivattom is also just half a kilometer away from the Jawaharlal Nehru International Stadium, which is Kerala's biggest sports stadium and India's 3rd largest.

There is a study center of the Indian Institute Of Architecture & Design (IIAD)

As part of the Kochi Metro Rail project, Palarivattom is going to be one of the major stops in the first phase launch of the Kochi Metro Network. The station will be situated at the north end of the junction.

There is a Government-run guest house for tourists (Yathri Nivas, KTDC) near to Suburban complex, and the main hospital is the Renai Medi City near the round junction and the Ernakulam Medical Center, near the highway signal junction.

Religious Institutions 

The region is also known for its centuries old temples and churches of various denominations. One of the oldest Hindu temples in the area is the Raja Rajeswary Temple, dedicated to the deity Jala Durga.

The Hari Hara Sudha Temple, dedicated to the Lord Ayyappa is newer, but more popular. Maha Ganapathy, Mahadeva, Sree Parvathy, Lord Muruga, Hanuman, Navagraha and Nagaraja also are represented in the temple, and there is a life sized statue of Sree Narayana Guru in the compound.

Near the Thammanam area of Palarivattom, there exists the Ananthapuram SreeKrishna Swamy Temple.

The church of St John The Baptist is located a short distance from the main commercial hub, and St Martin de Porres church (RC Syrian Catholic) on the main road has been renovated and has become an important landmark. An additional attraction here is an Auditorium near to the Main Road, with parking space.
Orthodox and Marthoma churches are also situated in Palarivattom, both the churches having their own auditorium for functions.

The new mosque on the main road is unique in that women are allowed in for prayers.

There is a Kingdom hall of Jehovah's witnesses too. It is situated at the end of the road opposite to the mosque.

Major residential projects 

 Trinity GreenArk
 Trinity New Castle
 Asset Versatile
 Galaxy Vesta
 Skyline Opus
 Mayflower
 Skypark
 SMS VISTA Apartments
 SMS TEJUS Apartments

Location

References

Neighbourhoods in Kochi